Christmas, Again is a 2014 drama romance written, directed, and produced by Charles Poekel. The film features Kentucker Audley in the lead role as a Christmas-tree salesman returning to New York City. The film had its premiere at the 2014 Locarno International Film Festival in Switzerland and also screened at 2015 Sundance Film Festival in the United States.

Plot
Noel, a heartbroken Christmas-tree salesman, returns to New York City hoping to put his past behind him. Living in a trailer and working the night shift, he begins to spiral downwards until the saving of a mysterious woman and some colorful customers rescue him from self-destruction.

Cast

Production
Writer-director Charles Poekel was himself a Christmas tree salesman and used his earnings to finance the film. The film was shot in 16 mm.

Critical reception
Based on 20 critics' reviews, Christmas, Again has a 100% approval rating on review aggregator website Rotten Tomatoes.

Sheila O'Malley of RogerEbert.com gave the film 3 and 1/2 stars out of 4 and said "the most striking thing about it is its evocation of an extremely specific mood. Once we settle into it, and it happens early, everything else becomes possible." Alonso Duralde of TheWrap noted, "Delicate and restrained, the film offers the messages of redemption and renewal we so often crave from a Christmas movie without wrapping its themes and characters in tinsel."

Accolades
The film has been nominated for several independent film awards including the John Cassavetes Award at the 2016 Independent Spirit Awards.

References

External links

American independent films
2014 independent films
Films set in New York City
2014 directorial debut films
Films shot in 16 mm film
2014 films
2014 drama films
American Christmas films
2010s English-language films
2010s American films